Hilis (formerly ) is a village de facto in the Askeran Province of the breakaway Republic of Artsakh, de jure in the Khojaly District of Azerbaijan, in the disputed region of Nagorno-Karabakh. The village has an ethnic Armenian-majority population, and also had an Armenian majority in 1989.

History 
During the Soviet period, the village was a part of the Askeran District of the Nagorno-Karabakh Autonomous Oblast.

Historical heritage sites 
Historical heritage sites in and around the village include a village and cemetery from between the 16th and 18th centuries, St. John's Church built in 1860, and a 19th-century spring monument.

Economy and culture 
The population is mainly engaged in agriculture and animal husbandry. As of 2015, the village has a municipal building, a house of culture, the Hilis branch of the Khndzristan Secondary School, and a medical centre.

Demographics 
The village had 172 inhabitants in 2005, and 180 inhabitants in 2015.

References

External links 
 

Populated places in Askeran Province
Populated places in Khojaly District